German Alexandrovich Rubtsov (born 27 June 1998) is a Russian professional ice hockey player. He is currently under contract with HC Spartak Moscow of the Kontinental Hockey League (KHL). He was selected by the Philadelphia Flyers in the first round, 22nd overall, in the 2016 NHL Entry Draft.

Playing career
He played with Vityaz junior team, Russkie Vityazi, before competing in the 2015–16 season for Team Russia U18 of the Junior Hockey League (MHL).

He signed a three-year entry-level contract with the Flyers on 2 March 2017.

Philadelphia Flyers 
During the 2019–20 season, Rubtsov made his NHL debut with the Flyers on 1 November 2019. He appeared in four games with the Flyers, going scoreless, before returning to the AHL with the Lehigh Valley Phantoms. Rubtsov collected just 2 goals and 13 points in 42 regular season games with the Phantoms before the season was cancelled due to the COVID-19 pandemic.

Rubtsov was initially named to Flyers Return to Play squad to participate in training camp in preparation for the playoffs. He was left off the final roster and on 23 August 2020, he was loaned to Russian club, HC Sochi of the KHL, until the commencement of the delayed 2020–21 North American season. Rubtsov continued with HC Sochi and was later determined to remain with the club for the duration of the campaign, finishing with 3 goals and 11 points through 46 regular season games.

With a year still remaining on his entry-level contract with the Flyers, in the off-season Rubtsov's KHL rights were traded from Sochi to SKA Saint Petersburg on 17 August 2021.

Florida Panthers 
On 19 March 2022, Rubtsov was involved in a trade that sent him along with Claude Giroux, Connor Bunnaman, and a draft pick to the Florida Panthers in exchange for Owen Tippett and some draft picks. Rubtsov only had four NHL games played with the Flyers before the trade.

At the end of the season, Rubstov was not offered a qualifying offer by the Panthers to retain his exclusive playing rights, thereby releasing him to free agency.

Return to Russia
Un-signed in North America, Rubtsov opted to return to his homeland to continue his career, signing a one-year, two-way contract with KHL outfit, HC Spartak Moscow, on 24 August 2022.

Career statistics

Regular season and playoffs

International

References

External links

1998 births
Living people
Acadie–Bathurst Titan players
Charlotte Checkers (2010–) players
Chicoutimi Saguenéens (QMJHL) players
Lehigh Valley Phantoms players
National Hockey League first-round draft picks
People from Chekhovsky District
Philadelphia Flyers draft picks
Philadelphia Flyers players
Russian ice hockey centres
HC Sochi players
HC Spartak Moscow players
HC Vityaz players
Sportspeople from Moscow Oblast